"Don't Ask Me How I Know" is a debut song co-written and recorded by American country music artist Bobby Pinson.  It was released in February 2005 as the first single from his debut album Man Like Me. Pinson co-wrote the song with Bart Butler and Brett Jones.

Critical reception
Deborah Evans Price of Billboard gave the song a favorable review, saying that "Pinson's gritty, weathered vocals infuse the lyric with a straight-ahead honesty; it feels like he has lived every word."

Music video
The music video was directed by David McClister and premiered in early 2005.

Chart performance
"Don't Ask Me How I Know" debuted at number 50 on the U.S. Billboard Hot Country Songs chart for the week of February 19, 2005.

References

2005 debut singles
2005 songs
Bobby Pinson songs
Songs written by Bobby Pinson
RCA Records Nashville singles
Songs written by Brett Jones (songwriter)
Songs written by Bart Butler